Gorden is an English variant of Gordon. Notable people with the name include:

given name;
 Gorden Kaye, English actor
 Gorden Kelley, American football player
 Gorden Moyo, Zimbabwean politician
 Gorden Tallis, Australian rugby player
 Gorden Wagener, chief design officer for Daimler AG

surname
Greg Gorden, American game designer

References

English masculine given names